Detling Peak is a cone-shaped, ice-covered peak located  southwest of Morrison Bluff in the Kohler Range, Marie Byrd Land. It was mapped by the United States Geological Survey from surveys and U.S. Navy air photos, 1959–66, and was named by the Advisory Committee on Antarctic Names for James K. Detling, a United States Antarctic Research Program biologist with the Marie Byrd Land Survey Party, 1966–67.

References 

Mountains of Marie Byrd Land